Gien de Kock (21 February 1908 – 14 February 1998) was a Dutch athlete. She competed in the women's javelin throw at the 1936 Summer Olympics.

References

External links
 

1908 births
1998 deaths
Athletes (track and field) at the 1936 Summer Olympics
Dutch female javelin throwers
Olympic athletes of the Netherlands
Athletes from Amsterdam